Sir William Capel (c. 1446-1515) of Capel Court in the parish of St Bartholomew-by-the-Exchange in the City of London and of Hadham Hall in the parish of Little Hadham, Hertfordshire, served as Lord Mayor of London and as a Member of Parliament for the City of London.

Origins
He was the son of John Capell (1398–1449) of Stoke-by-Nayland in Suffolk, a member of the Suffolk gentry, whose family had been seated at Capel St. Mary in Suffolk since the 12th century.

Career
William Capel was a member of the Worshipful Company of Drapers, who served as Sheriff of the City of London for 1496, and was twice elected Lord Mayor of London, in 1503 and 1510. He was elected as a Member of Parliament for the City of London from 1511 to 1515.

His London mansion stood in the vicinity of the present London Stock Exchange and of Capel Court (named after him, now a short sidestreet or walkway) in the City of London. He added a south chapel to his parish church of St Bartholomew-by-the-Exchange (demolished in 1840) in the City. He purchased the estate of Hadham Hall in the parish of Little Hadham, Hertfordshire, which remained in the Capell family from many generations. A new house was later built there, whether on the site of the old hall or on a new site is uncertain, which became the seat of his Capell descendants from the 1570s onwards.

Marriage and issue

He married Margaret Arundell, a daughter of Sir John Arundell (1421–1473) of Lanherne in Cornwall, by his second wife Katherine Chideocke, by whom he had issue including a son and two daughters:

Elizabeth Capell (abt 1480-1558), the first wife of William Paulet, 1st Marquess of Winchester.
Giles Capel (abt 1485-1556), son and heir, whose descendants included: Sir Gamaliel Capell (1561-1613), MP, of Rookwood Hall, Abbess Roding, Essex, 4th son of Henry Capell (d.1588), MP, of Little Hadham and of Rayne in Essex, by his wife Katherine Manners, a daughter of Thomas Manners, 1st Earl of Rutland; Arthur Capell, 1st Baron Capell of Hadham (1604–1649), only son of Sir Henry Capell of Rayne Hall in Essex by his wife Theodosia Montagu, a daughter of Sir Edward Montagu of Boughton House, Northamptonshire; Arthur Capell, 1st Earl of Essex (1631–1683), son of 1st Baron Capell, created Earl of Essex in 1661.
Dorothy Capel, the wife of John La Zouche, 8th Lord Zouche

References

1440s births
1515 deaths
Sheriffs of the City of London
16th-century lord mayors of London
15th-century English people
Members of the Parliament of England for the City of London
English MPs 1512–1514
English MPs 1515
Year of birth uncertain